Kick Out the Jams is the debut album by American proto-punk band MC5. It was released in February 1969, through Elektra Records. It was recorded live at Detroit's Grande Ballroom over two nights, Devil's Night and Halloween, 1968.

The LP peaked at No. 30 on the Billboard 200 chart, with the title track peaking at No. 82 in the Hot 100. Although the album received an unfavorable review in Rolling Stone magazine upon its release, it has gone on to be considered an important forerunner to punk rock music, and was ranked number 294 in both 2003 and 2012 editions of Rolling Stone "500 Greatest Albums of All Time" lists,  and at number 349 in a 2020 revised list.

Release
The album peaked at number 30 on the Billboard albums chart, "in the wake of a publicity blitz", wrote Robert Christgau in Christgau's Record Guide: Rock Albums of the Seventies (1981). In Canada, the album reached #37.

While "Ramblin' Rose" and "Motor City Is Burning" open with the band's typical leftist and revolutionary rhetoric, it was the opening line to the title track that stirred up controversy. Vocalist Rob Tyner shouted, "And right now... right now... right now it's time to... kick out the jams, motherfuckers!" before the opening riffs. Elektra Records executives were offended by the line and had preferred to edit it out of the album (replacing the offending words with "brothers and sisters"), while the band and manager John Sinclair adamantly opposed this.

The original release had "kick out the jams, Motherfuckers!" printed on the inside album cover, but was soon pulled from stores. Two versions were then released, both with censored album covers, with the uncensored audio version sold behind record counters.

Making matters worse, Hudson's department stores refused to carry the album. Tensions between the band and the Hudson's chain escalated to the point that the department stores refused to carry any album from the Elektra label after MC5 took out a full-page ad that, according to Danny Fields, "was just a picture of Rob Tyner, and all it said was 'Fuck Hudson's.' And it had the Elektra logo". To end the conflict and to avoid further financial loss, Elektra dropped MC5 from their record label.

Later the same year, Jefferson Airplane recorded the song "We Can Be Together" for their Volunteers album, a song containing the word "motherfucker". Unlike Elektra, RCA Records released the album wholly uncensored.

Title meaning

"Kick out the jams" has also been taken to be a slogan of the 1960s ethos of revolution and liberation, an incitement to "kick out" restrictions in various forms. To quote MC5 guitarist Wayne Kramer from his interview with Caroline Boucher in Disc & Music Echo magazine on August 8, 1970:

People said "oh wow, 'kick out the jams' means break down restrictions" etc., and it made good copy, but when we wrote it we didn't have that in mind. We first used the phrase when we were the house band at a ballroom in Detroit, and we played there every week with another band from the area. [...] We got in the habit, being the sort of punks we are, of screaming at them to get off the stage, to kick out the jams, meaning stop jamming. We were saying it all the time and it became a sort of esoteric phrase. Now, I think people can get what they like out of it; that's one of the good things about rock and roll.

Kramer also claimed during a 1999 interview that was excerpted for Goldmine magazine that the phrase was specifically aimed toward British 1960s bands playing at the Grande who MC5 felt were not putting enough energy into their performances. The title has also (jokingly) been reinterpreted as an establishment message masquerading as a revolutionary anthem. David Bowie sings in the song "Cygnet Committee": "[We] stoned the poor on slogans such as/Wish You Could Hear/Love Is All We Need/Kick Out the Jams/Kick Out Your Mother".

Critical reception

Upon its release, critic Lester Bangs, writing his inaugural review for Rolling Stone, called Kick Out the Jams a "ridiculous, overbearing, pretentious album". In contrast to this view, modern opinion of the album generally holds it in very high regard, noting its influence on rock music that has followed. Mark Deming of AllMusic called it "one of the most powerfully energetic live albums ever made" in a retrospective review. PopMatters reviewer Adam Williams wrote, "For my money, 'Kick Out the Jams' is one of the greatest records ever pressed. It is a magnificent time portal into the past, a fleeting glimpse of a band that actually had the balls to walk it like they talked it" and that "no live recording has captured the primal elements of rock more than the MC5's inaugural effort." Bangs himself would change his mind about the album, writing in a footnote in his Troggs essay "James Taylor Marked for Death":

Legacy

The album cover is briefly visible in the 1986 music video for "Don't Want to Know If You Are Lonely" by Hüsker Dü.

In March 2005, Q magazine placed the song "Kick Out the Jams" at number 39 in its "100 Greatest Guitar Tracks" list. The same track was named the 65th best hard rock song of all time by VH1.

"The MC5 were a mercurial band," remarked guitarist Wayne Kramer. "We were inconsistent. All of a sudden, this was the night. It was a lot of pressure for us to be under. I hear it every time I listen to the record. I hear me making clumsy mistakes on the guitar; I hear Dennis all over on the tempos; I hear Rob not quite in the perfect voice he was capable of."

Track listing

Personnel
 MC5

 Rob Tyner – lead vocals
 Wayne Kramer – lead guitar, backing vocals, lead vocals on "Ramblin' Rose"
 Fred "Sonic" Smith – rhythm guitar, backing vocals
 Michael Davis – bass guitar
 Dennis Thompson – drums

 Additional personnel

 Brother J. C. Crawford – "spiritual advisor"
 John Sinclair – "guidance", liner notes
 Bruce Botnick – engineer
 Robert L. Heimall, William S. Harvey – artwork
 Joel Brodsky – album cover photo
 Magdalena Sinclair – liner photography

References

Further reading

External links
 

MC5 albums
Albums produced by Jac Holzman
Albums produced by Bruce Botnick
1969 live albums
Live protopunk albums
Elektra Records live albums
1969 debut albums
Albums with cover art by Joel Brodsky
Live acid rock albums